is the fifth extended play by Australian rock band, the Basics. It was released, both digitally and on CD in stores, on 7 November 2014. The EP was recorded at Abbey Road Studios from 28 March to 2 April 2014, at the same time as the follow up studio album, The Age of Entitlement. Two of the EP's tracks, "Tunaomba Saidia" and "Good Times, Sunshine!", also appear on that album.

The music video for the title track debuted via the Facebook page for non-profit organisation, GetUp! Australia. Following its release the group embarked on a national tour.

Track listing

References

External links
 
 iTunes Edition

The Basics albums
2014 EPs